RoundAgain is a studio album by Joshua Redman's quartet, consisting of himself on saxophone, Brad Mehldau on piano, Christian McBride on bass, and Brian Blade on drums. The album was released on July 10, 2020 by Nonesuch Records label.

Background 
This release is this quartet's first recording since 1994’s MoodSwing. The album features seven new compositions: three by Redman, two by Mehldau, and one each by McBride and Blade. The album was recorded at Sear Sound Studio C, New York City, on September 10–12, 2019. The album was completed just before the pandemic lockdown.JAZZIZ Magazine included the album in its list of "10 Albums You Need to Know: July 2020".

Reception 
At Metacritic, that assigns a normalized rating out of 100 to reviews from mainstream critics, the album received an average score of 86, based on four reviews, which indicates "universal acclaim".

Giovanni Russonello of The New York Times wrote, "If “RoundAgain” has anything notably in common with “MoodSwing,” it is the feeling of musicians with a scary level of talent playing into the moment, with full faith that they belong within a lineage. The blend of outside influences into a consensual jazz language, the polyrhythmic play, the scholarly bravado: All those things felt fresh for these musicians in the 1990s, even if they usually don’t for young musicians right now. There’s something undeniable — consoling, even — about hearing them remain true to it today." Phillip Booth in his review for JazzTimes stated, "RoundAgain features a fresh batch of tunes by these acclaimed artists, bolstered by each player’s gifts as a top-shelf instrumentalist, powered by their steadfast ability to sync up, and informed by their collective experience in a wide variety of settings."

Mike Flynn of Jazzwise commented, "Once considered jazz’s 1990s brat pack, the Joshua Redman Quartet’s members are now edging toward elder-statesmen status and all rank among today’s top-billed artists." Matt Collar writing for AllMusic stated, " In some ways, RoundAgain feels like the perfect follow-up to MoodSwing, an album that could have arrived in the late '90s. Yet, it is hard to imagine Redman and his quartet summoning the same warmth and relaxed intensity that they do here without the decades of experience and deep familiarity they've cultivated with each other over the years." Robert Middleton of All About Jazz observed, "This is an album delving deeply into many themes and feelings reflecting life today in our crazy, troubled, dark, and yet somehow extraordinary times. It is alive, sublime, deep and exquisite in its tone and interplay. Four masters deliver a truly satisfying album."

Track listing

Personnel 
Musicians
 Joshua Redman – tenor saxophone, soprano saxophone
 Brad Mehldau – piano
 Christian McBride – bass
 Brian Blade – drums

Production
 Joshua Redman – producer, liner notes
 James Farber – associate producer, engineer
 Greg Calbi – engineer (mastering)
 JN-H – engineer (lacquer cutting)
 James Farber – engineer (mixing)
 Brian Montgomery – engineer (additional engineering)
 Owen Mulholland – engineer (assistant engineer)
 GuessWorks, Inc. (Andre Guess, Cheryl Guess) – management
 International Music Network – management
 Middle Way Music – management
 Wilkins Management, Inc. – management
 John Gall – design
 Michael Wilson – photography

Charts

References

External links 

Joshua Redman albums
2020 albums
Nonesuch Records albums